The 1953 Philadelphia Phillies season was the 71st in franchise history. They tied with the St. Louis Cardinals for third place in the National League with an 83–71 win–loss record.

Regular season

Season standings

Record vs. opponents

Game log 

|- style="background:#fbb"
| 1 || April 14 || Giants || 1–4 || Larry Jansen (1–0) || Robin Roberts (0–1) || None || 1,922 || 0–1
|- style="background:#bfb"
| 2 || April 15 || Giants || 8–1 || Curt Simmons (1–0) || Al Corwin (0–1) || None || 4,787 || 1–1
|- style="background:#fbb"
| 3 || April 16 || @ Pirates || 12–14 || Murry Dickson (1–1) || Andy Hansen (0–1) || None || 16,220 || 1–2
|- style="background:#bbb"
| – || April 17 || @ Pirates || colspan=6 | Postponed (rain and cold, cold weather); Makeup: May 21
|- style="background:#bbb"
| – || April 18 || @ Pirates || colspan=6 | Postponed (snow, cold); Makeup: May 27 as a traditional double-header
|- style="background:#bbb"
| – || April 19 || @ Giants || colspan=6 | Postponed (cold); Makeup: July 7 as a traditional double-header
|- style="background:#bfb"
| 4 || April 20 || @ Giants || 2–1 || Robin Roberts (1–1) || Larry Jansen (1–1) || None || 2,538 || 2–2
|- style="background:#bfb"
| 5 || April 21 || Dodgers || 7–1 || Curt Simmons (2–0) || Russ Meyer (1–1) || None || 14,309 || 3–2
|- style="background:#bfb"
| 6 || April 22 || Dodgers || 5–4 || Karl Drews (1–0) || Billy Loes (1–1) || None || 15,984 || 4–2
|- style="background:#bfb"
| 7 || April 23 || Dodgers || 6–1 || Robin Roberts (2–1) || Johnny Podres (0–2) || None || 25,508 || 5–2
|- style="background:#bfb"
| 8 || April 24 || Pirates || 5–3 || Jim Konstanty (1–0) || Bob Hall (0–1) || None || 6,506 || 6–2
|- style="background:#bfb"
| 9 || April 25 || Pirates || 7–6 || Curt Simmons (3–0) || Johnny Lindell (0–2) || Andy Hansen (1) || 6,265 || 7–2
|- style="background:#bfb"
| 10 || April 26 (1) || Pirates || 7–5 || Robin Roberts (3–1) || Bob Friend (1–1) || None || see 2nd game || 8–2
|- style="background:#bfb"
| 11 || April 26 (2) || Pirates || 8–1 || Karl Drews (2–0) || Bill Macdonald (0–1) || None || 18,490 || 9–2
|- style="background:#fbb"
| 12 || April 28 || Cardinals || 5–6 || Harvey Haddix (2–1) || Jim Konstanty (1–1) || Gerry Staley (1) || 12,281 || 9–3
|- style="background:#fbb"
| 13 || April 29 || Cardinals || 0–1 (11) || Al Brazle (1–1) || Curt Simmons (3–1) || None || 16,321 || 9–4
|- style="background:#fffdd0"
| 14 || April 30 || Cardinals || 1–1 (5) || None || None || None || 12,870 || 9–4–1
|-

|- style="background:#fbb"
| 15 || May 1 || Braves || 2–5 || Jim Wilson (1–0) || Karl Drews (2–1) || None || 9,472 || 9–5–1
|- style="background:#bbb"
| – || May 2 || Braves || colspan=6 | Postponed (rain); Makeup: July 21 as a traditional double-header
|- style="background:#bfb"
| 16 || May 3 (1) || Cubs || 5–1 || Robin Roberts (4–1) || Bob Rush (2–2) || None || see 2nd game || 10–5–1
|- style="background:#bfb"
| 17 || May 3 (2) || Cubs || 2–0 || Curt Simmons (4–1) || Warren Hacker (1–3) || None || 15,300 || 11–5–1
|- style="background:#bfb"
| 18 || May 4 || Cubs || 8–4 || Jim Konstanty (2–1) || Johnny Klippstein (1–1) || None || 8,526 || 12–5–1
|- style="background:#bbb"
| – || May 5 || Cubs || colspan=6 | Postponed (rain); Makeup: June 10 as a traditional double-header
|- style="background:#bbb"
| – || May 6 || Redlegs || colspan=6 | Postponed (rain); Makeup: July 16 as a traditional double-header
|- style="background:#bbb"
| – || May 7 || Redlegs || colspan=6 | Postponed (rain, wet grounds); Makeup: August 31 (Game 1) as a traditional double-header
|- style="background:#bbb"
| – || May 8 || @ Dodgers || colspan=6 | Postponed (rain); Makeup: May 9 as a double-header
|- style="background:#fbb"
| 19 || May 9 (1) || @ Dodgers || 6–7 || Ben Wade (2–0) || Robin Roberts (4–2) || None || 19,257 || 12–6–1
|- style="background:#bfb"
| 20 || May 9 (2) || @ Dodgers || 8–4 || Curt Simmons (5–1) || Joe Black (2–2) || None || 25,025 || 13–6–1
|- style="background:#fbb"
| 21 || May 10 || @ Dodgers || 0–5 || Billy Loes (4–1) || Karl Drews (2–2) || None || 23,843 || 13–7–1
|- style="background:#bfb"
| 22 || May 12 || @ Cardinals || 6–5 || Jim Konstanty (3–1) || Joe Presko (1–2) || Andy Hansen (2) || 9,247 || 14–7–1
|- style="background:#bbb"
| – || May 13 || @ Cardinals || colspan=6 | Postponed (rain, cold, cold and wet grounds); Makeup: June 27 as a double-header
|- style="background:#bbb"
| – || May 14 || @ Cubs || colspan=6 | Postponed (cold weather); Makeup: August 9 as a traditional double-header
|- style="background:#bfb"
| 23 || May 15 || @ Cubs || 1–0 || Robin Roberts (5–2) || Warren Hacker (1–5) || None || 6,531 || 15–7–1
|- style="background:#bfb"
| 24 || May 16 || @ Braves || 3–0 || Curt Simmons (6–1) || Don Liddle (1–1) || None || 23,578 || 16–7–1
|- style="background:#bbb"
| – || May 17 (1) || @ Braves || colspan=6 | Postponed (rain); Makeup: June 16 as a traditional double-header
|- style="background:#bbb"
| – || May 17 (2) || @ Braves || colspan=6 | Postponed (rain); Makeup: May 18
|- style="background:#fbb"
| 25 || May 18 || @ Braves || 0–4 || Bob Buhl (2–1) || Karl Drews (2–3) || None || 22,237 || 16–8–1
|- style="background:#bfb"
| 26 || May 19 || @ Redlegs || 6–3 || Robin Roberts (6–2) || Harry Perkowski (1–3) || None || 8,561 || 17–8–1
|- style="background:#fbb"
| 27 || May 20 || @ Redlegs || 5–14 || Joe Nuxhall (1–0) || Curt Simmons (6–2) || None || 2,890 || 17–9–1
|- style="background:#fbb"
| 28 || May 21 || @ Pirates || 2–7 || Murry Dickson (4–4) || Karl Drews (2–4) || None || 7,507 || 17–10–1
|- style="background:#fbb"
| 29 || May 23 || Dodgers || 0–2 || Preacher Roe (2–2) || Robin Roberts (6–3) || None || 31,532 || 17–11–1
|- style="background:#fbb"
| 30 || May 24 || Dodgers || 2–16 || Johnny Podres (1–2) || Curt Simmons (6–3) || Carl Erskine (1) || 24,715 || 17–12–1
|- style="background:#fbb"
| 31 || May 25 || Dodgers || 9–11 || Bob Milliken (1–0) || Jim Konstanty (3–2) || Joe Black (2) || 22,067 || 17–13–1
|- style="background:#bfb"
| 32 || May 27 (1) || @ Pirates || 14–2 || Robin Roberts (7–3) || Murry Dickson (4–5) || None || see 2nd game || 18–13–1
|- style="background:#fbb"
| 33 || May 27 (2) || @ Pirates || 6–8 || Roy Face (2–0) || Karl Drews (2–5) || Murry Dickson (2) || 16,935 || 18–14–1
|- style="background:#bfb"
| 34 || May 28 || @ Pirates || 9–8 || Jim Konstanty (4–2) || Paul LaPalme (2–4) || None || 2,437 || 19–14–1
|- style="background:#bfb"
| 35 || May 29 || @ Giants || 12–3 || Curt Simmons (7–3) || Larry Jansen (4–4) || None || 6,253 || 20–14–1
|- style="background:#bbb"
| – || May 30 (1) || @ Giants || colspan=6 | Postponed (rain); Makeup: August 15 as a traditional double-header
|- style="background:#bbb"
| – || May 30 (2) || @ Giants || colspan=6 | Postponed (rain); Makeup: August 16 as a traditional double-header
|- style="background:#bbb"
| – || May 31 || Giants || colspan=6 | Postponed (wet grounds); Makeup: August 22 as a traditional double-header
|-

|- style="background:#bfb"
| 36 || June 2 || Cardinals || 5–0 || Robin Roberts (8–3) || Cliff Chambers (0–3) || None || 15,064 || 21–14–1
|- style="background:#fbb"
| 37 || June 3 (1) || Cardinals || 3–5 || Vinegar Bend Mizell (5–2) || Curt Simmons (7–4) || Al Brazle (8) || see 2nd game || 21–15–1
|- style="background:#bfb"
| 38 || June 3 (2) || Cardinals || 6–5 || Steve Ridzik (1–0) || Al Brazle (2–3) || Andy Hansen (3) || 31,104 || 22–15–1
|- style="background:#bfb"
| 39 || June 4 || Cardinals || 6–5 (10) || Steve Ridzik (2–0) || Hal White (0–1) || None || 8,994 || 23–15–1
|- style="background:#fbb"
| 40 || June 5 || Braves || 2–3 (10) || Warren Spahn (6–1) || Jim Konstanty (4–3) || None || 16,025 || 23–16–1
|- style="background:#bfb"
| 41 || June 6 || Braves || 6–2 || Robin Roberts (9–3) || Jim Wilson (2–3) || None || 9,144 || 24–16–1
|- style="background:#fbb"
| 42 || June 7 (1) || Braves || 0–6 || Johnny Antonelli (6–1) || Steve Ridzik (2–1) || None || see 2nd game || 24–17–1
|- style="background:#fbb"
| 43 || June 7 (2) || Braves || 3–5 || Bob Buhl (4–2) || Thornton Kipper (0–1) || Lew Burdette (4) || 20,098 || 24–18–1
|- style="background:#bfb"
| 44 || June 8 || Cubs || 7–3 || Steve Ridzik (3–1) || Paul Minner (2–6) || None || 2,851 || 25–18–1
|- style="background:#bfb"
| 45 || June 9 || Cubs || 10–9 || Thornton Kipper (1–1) || Dutch Leonard (1–2) || None || 6,903 || 26–18–1
|- style="background:#bfb"
| 46 || June 10 (1) || Cubs || 9–1 || Robin Roberts (10–3) || Johnny Klippstein (4–5) || None || see 2nd game || 27–18–1
|- style="background:#bfb"
| 47 || June 10 (2) || Cubs || 8–5 || Jim Konstanty (5–3) || Warren Hacker (2–10) || Karl Drews (1) || 15,000 || 28–18–1
|- style="background:#fbb"
| 48 || June 12 || Redlegs || 1–4 || Jackie Collum (1–1) || Thornton Kipper (1–2) || None || 6,510 || 28–19–1
|- style="background:#bbb"
| – || June 13 || Redlegs || colspan=6 | Postponed (rain); Makeup: August 31 (Game 2) as a traditional double-header
|- style="background:#fbb"
| 49 || June 14 (1) || Redlegs || 1–2 || Ken Raffensberger (2–6) || Robin Roberts (10–4) || None || see 2nd game || 28–20–1
|- style="background:#bfb"
| 50 || June 14 (2) || Redlegs || 4–1 || Karl Drews (3–5) || Joe Nuxhall (3–3) || Bob Miller (1) || 9,391 || 29–20–1
|- style="background:#fbb"
| 51 || June 16 (1) || @ Braves || 5–6 (10) || Lew Burdette (6–0) || Kent Peterson (0–1) || None || see 2nd game || 29–21–1
|- style="background:#fbb"
| 52 || June 16 (2) || @ Braves || 2–3 || Max Surkont (9–1) || Jim Konstanty (5–4) || None || 33,962 || 29–22–1
|- style="background:#fbb"
| 53 || June 17 || @ Braves || 6–9 || Warren Spahn (8–1) || Bob Miller (0–1) || Lew Burdette (6) || 32,771 || 29–23–1
|- style="background:#bbb"
| – || June 18 || @ Braves || colspan=6 | Postponed (rain); Makeup: July 31 as a traditional double-header
|- style="background:#bfb"
| 54 || June 19 || @ Redlegs || 10–3 || Robin Roberts (11–4) || Ken Raffensberger (2–7) || None || 10,780 || 30–23–1
|- style="background:#bfb"
| 55 || June 20 || @ Redlegs || 3–1 || Karl Drews (4–5) || Joe Nuxhall (3–4) || Bob Miller (2) || 4,043 || 31–23–1
|- style="background:#bfb"
| 56 || June 21 (1) || @ Redlegs || 5–2 || Jim Konstanty (6–4) || Harry Perkowski (1–6) || None || see 2nd game || 32–23–1
|- style="background:#fbb"
| 57 || June 21 (2) || @ Redlegs || 3–5 || Fred Baczewski (1–0) || Steve Ridzik (3–2) || None || 14,992 || 32–24–1
|- style="background:#bfb"
| 58 || June 23 || @ Cubs || 6–1 || Robin Roberts (12–4) || Bob Rush (4–7) || None || 7,919 || 33–24–1
|- style="background:#bfb"
| 59 || June 24 || @ Cubs || 8–2 || Karl Drews (5–5) || Paul Minner (3–8) || None || 7,220 || 34–24–1
|- style="background:#bfb"
| 60 || June 25 || @ Cubs || 13–2 || Jim Konstanty (7–4) || Howie Pollet (2–3) || None || 6,135 || 35–24–1
|- style="background:#fbb"
| 61 || June 26 || @ Cardinals || 0–7 || Stu Miller (2–3) || Steve Ridzik (3–3) || None || 11,317 || 35–25–1
|- style="background:#fbb"
| 62 || June 27 (1) || @ Cardinals || 4–7 || Gerry Staley (11–2) || Robin Roberts (12–5) || None || 7,407 || 35–26–1
|- style="background:#fbb"
| 63 || June 27 (2) || @ Cardinals || 3–4 || Harvey Haddix (10–3) || Bob Miller (0–2) || None || 17,075 || 35–27–1
|- style="background:#bfb"
| 64 || June 28 || @ Cardinals || 4–3 (11) || Jim Konstanty (8–4) || Hal White (1–2) || None || 17,710 || 36–27–1
|- style="background:#bfb"
| 65 || June 30 || @ Dodgers || 10–9 (10) || Jim Konstanty (9–4) || Joe Black (5–3) || Karl Drews (2) || 23,956 || 37–27–1
|-

|- style="background:#fbb"
| 66 || July 1 || @ Dodgers || 4–5 (10) || Johnny Podres (3–2) || Robin Roberts (12–6) || None || 19,376 || 37–28–1
|- style="background:#fbb"
| 67 || July 2 || @ Dodgers || 0–8 || Carl Erskine (6–4) || Karl Drews (5–6) || None || 9,223 || 37–29–1
|- style="background:#bfb"
| 68 || July 3 || Giants || 5–1 || Jim Konstanty (10–4) || Larry Jansen (7–7) || None || 4,499 || 38–29–1
|- style="background:#fbb"
| 69 || July 4 (1) || Giants || 2–4 || Rubén Gómez (5–4) || Curt Simmons (7–5) || Hoyt Wilhelm (14) || see 2nd game || 38–30–1
|- style="background:#bfb"
| 70 || July 4 (2) || Giants || 10–4 || Thornton Kipper (2–2) || Jim Hearn (6–5) || None || 23,664 || 39–30–1
|- style="background:#bfb"
| 71 || July 5 (1) || @ Pirates || 2–0 (10) || Robin Roberts (13–6) || Murry Dickson (7–9) || None || see 2nd game || 40–30–1
|- style="background:#fbb"
| 72 || July 5 (2) || @ Pirates || 4–7 || Jim Waugh (1–0) || Steve Ridzik (3–4) || Paul LaPalme (1) || 11,404 || 40–31–1
|- style="background:#fbb"
| 73 || July 6 || @ Giants || 0–6 || Al Worthington (1–0) || Bob Miller (0–3) || None || 6,650 || 40–32–1
|- style="background:#fbb"
| 74 || July 7 (1) || @ Giants || 3–5 || Marv Grissom (3–6) || Jim Konstanty (10–5) || Hoyt Wilhelm (15) || see 2nd game || 40–33–1
|- style="background:#fbb"
| 75 || July 7 (2) || @ Giants || 1–9 || Al Corwin (5–2) || Thornton Kipper (2–3) || None || 34,736 || 40–34–1
|- style="background:#fbb"
| 76 || July 8 || Dodgers || 4–8 || Billy Loes (11–5) || Karl Drews (5–7) || None || 22,601 || 40–35–1
|- style="background:#bfb"
| 77 || July 9 || Dodgers || 6–5 || Bob Miller (1–3) || Jim Hughes (2–2) || Jim Konstanty (1) || 21,989 || 41–35–1
|- style="background:#bfb"
| 78 || July 10 || Pirates || 13–3 || Curt Simmons (8–5) || Murry Dickson (7–10) || None || 6,466 || 42–35–1
|- style="background:#bfb"
| 79 || July 11 || Pirates || 8–4 || Steve Ridzik (4–4) || Murry Dickson (7–11) || None || 3,608 || 43–35–1
|- style="background:#bfb"
| 80 || July 12 (1) || Pirates || 6–4 || Robin Roberts (14–6) || Roy Face (3–3) || None || see 2nd game || 44–35–1
|- style="background:#bfb"
| 81 || July 12 (2) || Pirates || 6–5 || Steve Ridzik (5–4) || Paul LaPalme (3–10) || None || 10,806 || 45–35–1
|- style="background:#bbcaff;"
| – || July 14 ||colspan="7" |1953 Major League Baseball All-Star Game at Crosley Field in Cincinnati
|- style="background:#bfb"
| 82 || July 16 (1) || Redlegs || 3–1 || Robin Roberts (15–6) || Bud Podbielan (5–9) || None || see 2nd game || 46–35–1
|- style="background:#bfb"
| 83 || July 16 (2) || Redlegs || 3–2 || Bob Miller (2–3) || Ken Raffensberger (5–8) || None || 19,834 || 47–35–1
|- style="background:#fbb"
| 84 || July 17 || Redlegs || 2–3 || Harry Perkowski (7–7) || Curt Simmons (8–6) || Clyde King (2) || 6,013 || 47–36–1
|- style="background:#fbb"
| 85 || July 18 || Redlegs || 0–11 || Jackie Collum (3–4) || Jim Konstanty (10–6) || None || 3,201 || 47–37–1
|- style="background:#fbb"
| 86 || July 19 (1) || Cubs || 3–5 || Paul Minner (6–10) || Karl Drews (5–8) || Howie Pollet (1) || see 2nd game || 47–38–1
|- style="background:#bfb"
| 87 || July 19 (2) || Cubs || 6–5 || Thornton Kipper (3–3) || Johnny Klippstein (5–8) || None || 8,689 || 48–38–1
|- style="background:#bfb"
| 88 || July 21 (1) || Braves || 10–0 || Robin Roberts (16–6) || Bob Buhl (6–5) || None || see 2nd game || 49–38–1
|- style="background:#fbb"
| 89 || July 21 (2) || Braves || 3–7 || Johnny Antonelli (9–5) || Curt Simmons (8–7) || None || 35,174 || 49–39–1
|- style="background:#bfb"
| 90 || July 22 || Braves || 6–3 || Jim Konstanty (11–6) || Warren Spahn (12–4) || Karl Drews (3) || 12,756 || 50–39–1
|- style="background:#bbb"
| – || July 23 || Braves || colspan=6 | Postponed (rain, wet grounds); Makeup: August 25 as a traditional double-header
|- style="background:#bfb"
| 91 || July 24 || Cardinals || 2–1 || Bob Miller (3–3) || Harvey Haddix (11–4) || None || 15,953 || 51–39–1
|- style="background:#bfb"
| 92 || July 25 || Cardinals || 3–0 || Robin Roberts (17–6) || Vinegar Bend Mizell (8–6) || None || 27,003 || 52–39–1
|- style="background:#fbb"
| 93 || July 26 || Cardinals || 6–8 || Al Brazle (4–4) || Curt Simmons (8–8) || None || 14,436 || 52–40–1
|- style="background:#fbb"
| 94 || July 28 || @ Redlegs || 4–5 || Harry Perkowski (9–7) || Bob Miller (3–4) || None || 15,533 || 52–41–1
|- style="background:#fbb"
| 95 || July 29 || @ Redlegs || 4–13 || Jackie Collum (4–5) || Robin Roberts (17–7) || None || 13,282 || 52–42–1
|- style="background:#bfb"
| 96 || July 30 || @ Redlegs || 17–8 || Steve Ridzik (6–4) || Frank Smith (5–1) || None || 2,773 || 53–42–1
|- style="background:#bfb"
| 97 || July 31 (1) || @ Braves || 5–1 || Robin Roberts (18–7) || Johnny Antonelli (9–7) || None || see 2nd game || 54–42–1
|- style="background:#fffdd0"
| 98 || July 31 (2) || @ Braves || 0–0 (12) || None || None || None || 29,802 || 54–42–2
|-

|- style="background:#fbb"
| 99 || August 1 || @ Braves || 0–5 || Warren Spahn (14–4) || Jim Konstanty (11–7) || None || 23,791 || 54–43–2
|- style="background:#bfb"
| 100 || August 2 (1) || @ Braves || 4–1 || Curt Simmons (9–8) || Don Liddle (4–4) || None || see 2nd game || 55–43–2
|- style="background:#fbb"
| 101 || August 2 (2) || @ Braves || 1–6 || Bob Buhl (8–5) || Steve Ridzik (6–5) || None || 31,300 || 55–44–2
|- style="background:#fbb"
| 102 || August 3 || @ Cardinals || 3–8 || Vinegar Bend Mizell (9–6) || Jim Konstanty (11–8) || Al Brazle (11) || 11,580 || 55–45–2
|- style="background:#bfb"
| 103 || August 4 || @ Cardinals || 8–1 || Robin Roberts (19–7) || Gerry Staley (13–6) || None || 12,636 || 56–45–2
|- style="background:#bfb"
| 104 || August 5 || @ Cardinals || 7–3 || Bob Miller (4–4) || Willard Schmidt (0–1) || None || 6,538 || 57–45–2
|- style="background:#fbb"
| 105 || August 6 || @ Cardinals || 0–2 || Harvey Haddix (14–4) || Curt Simmons (9–9) || None || 9,073 || 57–46–2
|- style="background:#bfb"
| 106 || August 7 || @ Cubs || 5–4 || Steve Ridzik (7–5) || Paul Minner (7–12) || Jim Konstanty (2) || 4,499 || 58–46–2
|- style="background:#fbb"
| 107 || August 8 || @ Cubs || 1–4 || Howie Pollet (4–4) || Robin Roberts (19–8) || None || 12,636 || 58–47–2
|- style="background:#bfb"
| 108 || August 9 (1) || @ Cubs || 7–0 || Bob Miller (5–4) || Bob Rush (6–10) || None || see 2nd game || 59–47–2
|- style="background:#fbb"
| 109 || August 9 (2) || @ Cubs || 5–6 || Johnny Klippstein (7–9) || Jim Konstanty (11–9) || None || 22,088 || 59–48–2
|- style="background:#bfb"
| 110 || August 11 || @ Pirates || 3–0 || Curt Simmons (10–9) || Murry Dickson (8–16) || None || 8,985 || 60–48–2
|- style="background:#bfb"
| 111 || August 12 || @ Pirates || 8–4 || Robin Roberts (20–8) || Johnny Lindell (5–13) || None || 6,505 || 61–48–2
|- style="background:#fbb"
| 112 || August 13 || @ Pirates || 3–4 || Paul LaPalme (6–13) || Bob Miller (5–5) || None || 2,373 || 61–49–2
|- style="background:#bbb"
| – || August 14 || @ Giants || colspan=6 | Postponed (rain, Hurricane Barbara); Makeup: August 17 as a traditional double-header
|- style="background:#fbb"
| 113 || August 15 (1) || @ Giants || 1–4 || Marv Grissom (4–7) || Curt Simmons (10–10) || None || see 2nd game || 61–50–2
|- style="background:#bfb"
| 114 || August 15 (2) || @ Giants || 5–2 || Jim Konstanty (12–9) || Larry Jansen (10–10) || None || 9,873 || 62–50–2
|- style="background:#fbb"
| 115 || August 16 (1) || @ Giants || 1–8 || Jim Hearn (7–7) || Robin Roberts (20–9) || None || see 2nd game || 62–51–2
|- style="background:#fbb"
| 116 || August 16 (2) || @ Giants || 3–4 || Rubén Gómez (10–6) || Karl Drews (5–9) || None || 16,926 || 62–52–2
|- style="background:#bfb"
| 117 || August 17 (1) || @ Giants || 5–2 || Bob Miller (6–5) || Dave Koslo (3–10) || Jim Konstanty (3) || see 2nd game || 63–52–2
|- style="background:#fbb"
| 118 || August 17 (2) || @ Giants || 0–6 || Al Corwin (6–2) || Andy Hansen (0–2) || None || 2,885 || 63–53–2
|- style="background:#bfb"
| 119 || August 18 || Pirates || 1–0 || Steve Ridzik (8–5) || Paul LaPalme (6–14) || Robin Roberts (1) || 3,945 || 64–53–2
|- style="background:#fbb"
| 120 || August 19 || Pirates || 3–5 || Roy Face (6–5) || Curt Simmons (10–11) || None || 4,554 || 64–54–2
|- style="background:#fbb"
| 121 || August 20 || Pirates || 2–5 || Jim Waugh (3–3) || Robin Roberts (20–10) || None || 4,376 || 64–55–2
|- style="background:#bfb"
| 122 || August 21 || Giants || 7–6 || Steve Ridzik (9–5) || Dave Koslo (3–11) || Jim Konstanty (4) || 15,925 || 65–55–2
|- style="background:#bfb"
| 123 || August 22 (1) || Giants || 7–1 || Karl Drews (6–9) || Sal Maglie (8–9) || None || see 2nd game || 66–55–2
|- style="background:#bfb"
| 124 || August 22 (2) || Giants || 6–5 || Jim Konstanty (13–9) || Al Worthington (2–5) || Robin Roberts (2) || 22,554 || 67–55–2
|- style="background:#bfb"
| 125 || August 23 || Giants || 6–3 || Curt Simmons (11–11) || Larry Jansen (10–11) || None || 12,929 || 68–55–2
|- style="background:#bfb"
| 126 || August 25 (1) || Braves || 6–1 || Robin Roberts (21–10) || Johnny Antonelli (10–9) || None || see 2nd game || 69–55–2
|- style="background:#fbb"
| 127 || August 25 (2) || Braves || 2–6 || Lew Burdette (13–2) || Bob Miller (6–6) || None || 31,596 || 69–56–2
|- style="background:#bfb"
| 128 || August 26 || Braves || 6–5 || Karl Drews (7–9) || Bob Buhl (10–7) || Jim Konstanty (5) || 13,918 || 70–56–2
|- style="background:#bfb"
| 129 || August 28 || Cubs || 5–0 || Curt Simmons (12–11) || Howie Pollet (4–7) || None || 5,956 || 71–56–2
|- style="background:#fbb"
| 130 || August 29 || Cubs || 0–2 || Paul Minner (9–14) || Robin Roberts (21–11) || None || 5,156 || 71–57–2
|- style="background:#bfb"
| 131 || August 30 (1) || Redlegs || 4–2 || Karl Drews (8–9) || Jackie Collum (7–9) || None || see 2nd game || 72–57–2
|- style="background:#bfb"
| 132 || August 30 (2) || Redlegs || 4–3 || Jim Konstanty (14–9) || Ken Raffensberger (7–12) || None || 9,422 || 73–57–2
|- style="background:#fbb"
| 133 || August 31 (1) || Redlegs || 6–12 || Joe Nuxhall (7–9) || Bob Miller (6–7) || Fred Baczewski (1) || see 2nd game || 73–58–2
|- style="background:#fbb"
| 134 || August 31 (2) || Redlegs || 5–7 || Harry Perkowski (11–9) || Jim Konstanty (14–10) || None || 9,490 || 73–59–2
|-

|- style="background:#fbb"
| 135 || September 2 || Cardinals || 7–10 || Hal White (5–5) || Robin Roberts (21–12) || Al Brazle (14) || 11,964 || 73–60–2
|- style="background:#bfb"
| 136 || September 3 || Cardinals || 2–1 || Curt Simmons (13–11) || Harvey Haddix (16–8) || None || 8,154 || 74–60–2
|- style="background:#bfb"
| 137 || September 6 || @ Pirates || 7–2 || Karl Drews (9–9) || Roy Face (6–6) || None || 5,890 || 75–60–2
|- style="background:#fbb"
| 138 || September 7 (1) || @ Dodgers || 2–6 || Carl Erskine (18–6) || Robin Roberts (21–13) || None || see 2nd game || 75–61–2
|- style="background:#fbb"
| 139 || September 7 (2) || @ Dodgers || 2–6 || Billy Loes (13–7) || Curt Simmons (13–12) || None || 33,337 || 75–62–2
|- style="background:#fbb"
| 140 || September 8 || @ Braves || 2–3 || Johnny Antonelli (12–10) || Johnny Lindell (5–17) || None || 28,629 || 75–63–2
|- style="background:#bfb"
| 141 || September 9 || @ Braves || 2–0 || Bob Miller (7–7) || Warren Spahn (19–7) || None || 31,049 || 76–63–2
|- style="background:#fbb"
| 142 || September 11 || @ Redlegs || 5–6 || Harry Perkowski (12–9) || Robin Roberts (21–14) || Frank Smith (2) || 4,737 || 76–64–2
|- style="background:#fbb"
| 143 || September 12 || @ Redlegs || 2–3 || Joe Nuxhall (8–10) || Karl Drews (9–10) || None || 2,190 || 76–65–2
|- style="background:#fbb"
| 144 || September 13 || @ Cardinals || 3–17 || Harvey Haddix (18–8) || Curt Simmons (13–13) || None || 11,841 || 76–66–2
|- style="background:#bfb"
| 145 || September 14 || @ Cardinals || 6–5 || Johnny Lindell (6–17) || Vinegar Bend Mizell (13–9) || None || 5,214 || 77–66–2
|- style="background:#bfb"
| 146 || September 15 || @ Cubs || 4–2 || Robin Roberts (22–14) || Paul Minner (10–15) || None || 3,185 || 78–66–2
|- style="background:#fbb"
| 147 || September 16 || @ Cubs || 4–7 || Howie Pollet (6–7) || Bob Miller (7–8) || Bubba Church (1) || 3,448 || 78–67–2
|- style="background:#bfb"
| 148 || September 17 || @ Cubs || 16–4 || Curt Simmons (14–13) || Don Elston (0–1) || None || 2,793 || 79–67–2
|- style="background:#fbb"
| 149 || September 19 || @ Dodgers || 4–5 || Russ Meyer (15–5) || Robin Roberts (22–15) || None || 9,057 || 79–68–2
|- style="background:#fbb"
| 150 || September 20 (1) || @ Dodgers || 4–5 || Ben Wade (7–5) || Steve Ridzik (9–6) || None || see 2nd game || 79–69–2
|- style="background:#bfb"
| 151 || September 20 (2) || @ Dodgers || 2–1 (5) || Bob Miller (8–8) || Billy Loes (13–8) || None || 23,558 || 80–69–2
|- style="background:#bfb"
| 152 || September 22 || Giants || 9–3 || Curt Simmons (15–13) || Larry Jansen (10–16) || None || 4,100 || 81–69–2
|- style="background:#bfb"
| 153 || September 23 || Giants || 2–1 || Robin Roberts (23–15) || Marv Grissom (6–8) || None || 4,030 || 82–69–2
|- style="background:#fbb"
| 154 || September 25 || Dodgers || 3–4 || Clem Labine (11–6) || Bob Miller (8–9) || None || 11,324 || 82–70–2
|- style="background:#bfb"
| 155 || September 26 || Dodgers || 2–1 (10) || Curt Simmons (16–13) || Bob Milliken (8–4) || None || 15,046 || 83–70–2
|- style="background:#fbb"
| 156 || September 27 || Dodgers || 2–8 || Billy Loes (14–8) || Robin Roberts (23–16) || Ben Wade (3) || 16,637 || 83–71–2
|-

| style="text-align:left;" |
The second game on July 5 was suspended (Sunday curfew) in the top of the seventh inning with the score 0–7 and was completed August 11, 1953.
The original schedule indicated single games on September 20 and 21.

Roster

Player stats

Batting

Starters by position 
Note: Pos = Position; G = Games played; AB = At bats; H = Hits; Avg. = Batting average; HR = Home runs; RBI = Runs batted in

Other batters 
Note: G = Games played; AB = At bats; H = Hits; Avg. = Batting average; HR = Home runs; RBI = Runs batted in

Pitching

Starting pitchers 
Note: G = Games pitched; IP = Innings pitched; W = Wins; L = Losses; ERA = Earned run average; SO = Strikeouts

Other pitchers 
Note: G = Games pitched; IP = Innings pitched; W = Wins; L = Losses; ERA = Earned run average; SO = Strikeouts

Relief pitchers 
Note: G = Games pitched; W = Wins; L = Losses; SV = Saves; ERA = Earned run average; SO = Strikeouts

Awards and honors

League leaders 
 Robin Roberts, National League leader, complete games (33). Nobody had more complete games in one season throughout the 1950s.

Farm system 

LEAGUE CHAMPIONS: Spokane, Salt Lake City

Notes

References 
1953 Philadelphia Phillies season at Baseball Reference

Philadelphia Phillies seasons
Philadelphia Phillies season
Philadelphia